Munich is a 2005 historical drama film produced and directed by Steven Spielberg, co-written by Tony Kushner and Eric Roth. It is based on the 1984 book Vengeance by George Jonas, an account of Operation Wrath of God, the Israeli government's secret retaliation against the Palestine Liberation Organization after the Munich massacre at the 1972 Summer Olympics.

Munich was released by Universal Pictures in the United States and internationally by DreamWorks Pictures through United International Pictures on December 23, 2005, and received five Oscar nominations: Best Picture, Best Director, Best Adapted Screenplay, Best Editing, and Best Score. The film made $131 million worldwide but just $47 million in the United States, making it one of Spielberg's lowest-grossing films domestically. In 2017, the film was named the 16th "Best Film of the 21st Century So Far" by The New York Times.

Plot
 
At the 1972 Summer Olympics in Munich, the Palestinian terrorist group Black September kills 11 members of the Israeli Olympic team. Avner Kaufman, a Mossad agent of German-Jewish descent, is chosen to lead a mission to assassinate 11 Palestinians allegedly involved in the massacre. At the direction of his handler Ephraim, to give the Israeli government plausible deniability, Kaufman resigns from Mossad and operates with no official ties to Israel. His team includes four Jewish volunteers from around the world: South African driver Steve, Belgian toy-maker and explosives expert Robert, former Israeli soldier and "cleaner" Carl, and German antiques dealer and document forger Hans from Frankfurt. They are given information by a French informant, Louis.

In Rome, the team shoots and kills Wael Zwaiter, who is living as a poet. In Paris, they detonate a bomb in the home of Mahmoud Hamshari; in Cyprus, they bomb the hotel room of Hussein Abd Al Chir. With IDF commandos, they pursue three Palestinian militants—Muhammad Youssef al-Najjar, Kamal Adwan, and Kamal Nasser—to Beirut, penetrate the Palestinians' guarded compound and kill all three.

Between hits, the assassins argue with each other about the morality and logistics of their mission, expressing fear about their individual lack of experience, as well as their apparent ambivalence about accidentally killing innocent bystanders. Avner makes a brief visit to his wife, who has given birth to their first baby. In Athens, when they track down Zaiad Muchasi, the team finds out that Louis arranged for them to share a safe house with their rival PLO members and the Mossad agents escape trouble by pretending to be members of foreign militant groups like ETA, IRA, ANC, and the Red Army Faction. Avner has a heartfelt conversation with PLO member Ali over their homelands and who deserves to rule over the lands; Ali is later shot by Carl while the team escapes from the hit on Muchasi.

The squad moves on to London to track down Ali Hassan Salameh, who orchestrated the Munich massacre, but the assassination attempt is interrupted by several drunken Americans. It is implied that these are agents of the CIA, which, according to Louis, protects and funds Salameh in exchange for his promise not to attack US diplomats. Meanwhile, attempts are made to kill the assassins themselves. Carl is killed by an independent Dutch contract killer. In revenge, the team tracks her down and executes her at a houseboat in Hoorn, Netherlands. Hans is found stabbed to death on a park bench and Robert is killed by an explosion in his workshop. Avner and Steve finally locate Salameh in Spain, but again their assassination attempt is thwarted, this time by Salameh's armed guards. Avner and Steve disagree on whether Louis has sold information on the team to the PLO.

A disillusioned Avner flies to Israel, where he is unhappy to be hailed as a hero by two young soldiers and then to his new home in Brooklyn, where he suffers post-traumatic stress and paranoia. Concerns continue to grow when he speaks to Louis's father by phone and it is revealed he knows his real name and promises no violence will come to him from his family. He is thrown out of the Israeli consulate after storming in to demand that Mossad leave his wife and child alone. Ephraim comes to ask Avner to return to Israel and Mossad, but Avner refuses. Avner then asks Ephraim to come to dinner with his family, to break bread as an allegory to make peace, but Ephraim refuses, perhaps as a sign that neither side will reconcile.

Cast

 Eric Bana as Avner Kaufman (based on Yuval Aviv)
 Daniel Craig as Steve
 Ciarán Hinds as Carl
 Mathieu Kassovitz as Robert
 Hanns Zischler as Hans
 Ayelet Zurer as Daphna Kaufman
 Geoffrey Rush as Ephraim
 Mehdi Nebbou as Ali Hassan Salameh
 Gila Almagor as Avner's Mother
 Karim Saleh as Issa
 Michael Lonsdale as Papa
 Mathieu Amalric as Louis
 Ziad Adwan as Kamal Adwan
 Moritz Bleibtreu as Andreas
 Yvan Attal as Tony
 Valeria Bruni Tedeschi as Sylvie
 Meret Becker as Yvonne
 Roy Avigdori as Gad Tsobari
 Marie-Josée Croze as Jeanette, the Dutch assassin
 Lynn Cohen as Golda Meir
 Guri Weinberg as Moshe Weinberg
 Makram Khoury as Wael Zwaiter
 Hiam Abbass as Marie Claude Hamshari
 Omar Metwally as Ali
 Sam Feuer as Yosef Romano

Critical reception
On Rotten Tomatoes, the film has a 78% approval rating based on 211 reviews, with an average rating of 7.40/10. The site's consensus reads, "Munich can't quite achieve its lofty goals, but this thrilling, politically even-handed look at the fallout from an intractable political conflict is still well worth watching." Metacritic assigned the film a weighted average score of 74 out of 100, based on 39 critics, indicating "generally favorable reviews". Audiences polled by CinemaScore gave the film an average grade of "B+" on an A+ to F scale.

Roger Ebert praised the film, saying, "With this film [Spielberg] has dramatically opened a wider dialogue, helping to make the inarguable into the debatable." He placed it at No. 3 on his top ten list of 2005. James Berardinelli wrote that "Munich is an eye-opener – a motion picture that asks difficult questions, presents well-developed characters, and keeps us white-knuckled throughout." He named it the best film of the year; it was the only film in 2005 to which Berardinelli gave four stars, and he also put it on his Top 100 Films of All Time list. Entertainment Weekly film critic Owen Gleiberman mentioned Munich amongst the best movies of the decade. Rex Reed from The New York Observer disagrees, writing: "With no heart, no ideology and not much intellectual debate, Munich is a big disappointment, and something of a bore."

Variety reviewer Todd McCarthy called Munich a "beautifully made" film. However, he criticized the film for failing to include "compelling" characters, and for its use of laborious plotting and a "flabby script." McCarthy says that the film turns into "... a lumpy and overlong morality play on a failed thriller template." To succeed, McCarthy states that Spielberg would have needed to engage the viewer in the assassin squad leader's growing crisis of conscience and create a more "sustain(ed) intellectual interest" for the viewer. Writing in Empire, Ian Nathan wrote "Munich is Steven Spielberg's most difficult film. It arrives already inflamed by controversy. ... This is Spielberg operating at his peak—an exceptionally made, provocative, and vital film for our times."

Chicago Tribune reviewer Allison Benedikt calls Munich a "competent thriller", but laments that as an "intellectual pursuit, it is little more than a pretty prism through which superficial Jewish guilt and generalized Palestinian nationalism" are made to "... look like the product of serious soul-searching." Benedikt states that Spielberg's treatment of the film's "dense and complicated" subject matter can be summed up as "Palestinians want a homeland, Israelis have to protect theirs." She rhetorically asks: "Do we need another handsome, well-assembled, entertaining movie to prove that we all bleed red?"

Another critique was Gabriel Schoenfeld's "Spielberg's 'Munich'" in the February 2006 issue of Commentary, who called it "pernicious". He compared the fictional film to history, asserted that Spielberg and especially Kushner felt that the Palestinian terrorists and the Mossad agents are morally equivalent and concluded: "The movie deserves an Oscar in one category only: most hypocritical film of the year." Israeli author and journalist Aaron J. Klein wrote in Slate that the movie was a "distortion" of facts, concluding that "A rigorous factual accounting may not be the point of Munich, which Spielberg has characterized as a 'prayer for peace.' But as result, Munich has less to do with history and the grim aftermath of the Munich Massacre than some might wish."

In defense of the climactic sex scene, critics Jim Emerson of the Chicago Sun-Times and Matt Zoller Seitz of Salon compared it to Lady Macbeth's suicide in William Shakespeare's Macbeth, interpreting the sequence as representing the corruption of Avner's personal life as a result of his being conditioned to kill others to avenge Munich.

Top ten lists
Munich was listed on many critics' top ten lists.

 1st – Owen Gleiberman, Entertainment Weekly
 1st – James Berardinelli, Reelviews
 1st – David Edelstein, Slate
 2nd – William Arnold, Seattle Post-Intelligencer
 2nd – Scott Tobias, The A.V. Club
 3rd – Roger Ebert, Chicago Sun-Times
 4th – Richard Roeper, Ebert & Roeper
 4th – Claudia Puig, USA Today
 5th – Peter Travers, Rolling Stone
 5th – Lisa Schwarzbaum, Entertainment Weekly
 5th – Richard Schickel, Time
 5th – Kimberly Jones, Austin Chronicle
 5th – Ty Burr, Boston Globe
 5th – Kenneth Turan, Los Angeles Times
 7th – Scott Foundas, L.A. Weekly
 8th – David Ansen, Newsweek
 8th – Steve Davis, Austin Chronicle
 9th – Chris Kaltenbach, Baltimore Sun
 10th – Michael Wilmington, Chicago Tribune
 10th – Tasha Robinson, The A.V. Club
 10th – A.O. Scott, The New York Times
 Top 10 (listed alphabetically) – Carrie Rickey & Steven Rea, Philadelphia Inquirer
 Top 10 (listed alphabetically) – Manohla Dargis, The New York Times

Controversies
Some reviewers criticized Munich for what they call the film's equating the Israeli assassins with "terrorists". Leon Wieseltier wrote in The New Republic: "Worse, Munich prefers a discussion of counter-terrorism to a discussion of terrorism; or it thinks that they are the same discussion".

Melman and other critics of the book and the film have said that the story's premise—that Israeli agents had second thoughts about their work—is not supported by interviews or public statements. In an interview with Reuters, a retired head of Israel's Shin Bet intelligence service and former Internal Security Minister, Avi Dichter, likened Munich to a children's adventure story: "There is no comparison between what you see in the movie and how it works in reality". In a Time magazine cover story about the film on December 4, 2005, Spielberg said that the source of the film had second thoughts about his actions. "There is something about killing people at close range that is excruciating," Spielberg said. "It's bound to try a man's soul." Of the real Avner, Spielberg says, "I don't think he will ever find peace."

The Zionist Organization of America (ZOA) – describing itself as "the oldest, and one of the largest, pro-Israel and Zionist organizations in the United States" – called for a boycott of the film on December 27, 2005. The ZOA criticized the factual basis of the film and leveled criticism at one of the screenwriters, Tony Kushner, whom the ZOA has described as an "Israel-hater". Criticism was also directed at the Anti-Defamation League's (ADL) National Director, Abraham Foxman, for his support of the film.

David Edelstein of the online Slate magazine argued that "The Israeli government and many conservative and pro-Israeli commentators have lambasted the film for naiveté, for implying that governments should never retaliate. But an expression of uncertainty and disgust is not the same as one of outright denunciation. What Munich does say is that this shortsighted tit-for-tat can produce a kind of insanity, both individual and collective."

Ilana Romano, wife of an Israeli weightlifter Yossef Romano killed in the Munich massacre, said that Spielberg overlooked the Lillehammer affair, although Spielberg seems to have been conscious of the omission; the film's opening title frame shows Lillehammer in a montage of city names, with Munich standing out from the rest. The Jewish Journal said that "the revenge squad obsess about making sure only their targets are hit -- and meticulous care is taken to avoid collateral damage. Yet in one shootout an innocent man is also slain ... The intense moral contortions the agents experience as the corpses pile up makes up the substance of the movie."

According to Ronen Bergman as reported in Newsweek, it is a myth that Mossad agents hunted down and killed those responsible for the killing of 11 Israeli athletes and a German policeman at the 1972 Munich Olympic Games; in fact most of the people were never killed or caught. Most of the people that Mossad did kill had nothing to do with the Munich deaths. He says the film was based on a book whose source was an Israeli who claimed to be the lead assassin of the hit squad, but in fact was a baggage inspector at Tel Aviv airport.

Historical authenticity
Although Munich is a work of fiction, it describes many actual events and figures from the early 1970s. On the Israeli side, Prime Minister Golda Meir is depicted in the film, and other military and political leaders such as Attorney General Meir Shamgar, Mossad chief Zvi Zamir and Aman chief Aharon Yariv are also depicted. Spielberg tried to make the depiction of the hostage-taking and killing of the Israeli athletes historically authentic. Unlike an earlier film, 21 Hours at Munich, Spielberg's film depicts the shooting of all the Israeli athletes, which according to the autopsies was accurate. In addition, the film uses actual news clips shot during the hostage situation.

Israeli/American actor Guri Weinberg portrays his own father, wrestling coach Moshe.  The younger Weinberg was only one month old when his father was killed.

The named members of Black September, and their deaths, are also mostly factual. Abdel Wael Zwaiter, a translator at the Libyan Embassy in Rome, was shot 11 times, one bullet for each of the victims of the Munich Massacre, in the lobby of his apartment 41 days after Munich. On December 8 of that year Mahmoud Hamshari, a senior PLO figure, was killed in Paris by a bomb concealed in the table below his telephone. Although the film depicts the bomb being concealed in the telephone itself, other details of the assassination (such as confirmation of the target via telephone call) are accurate. Others killed during this period include Mohammed Boudia, Basil al-Kubasi, Hussein al-Bashir, and Zaiad Muchasi, some of whose deaths are depicted in the film. Ali Hassan Salameh was also a real person, and a prominent member of Black September. In 1979 he was killed in Beirut by a car bomb that also killed four innocent bystanders and injured 18 others.

The commando raid in Beirut, known as Operation Spring of Youth, also occurred. This attack included future Israeli Prime Minister Ehud Barak and Yom Kippur War and Operation Entebbe hero Yonatan Netanyahu, who are both portrayed by name in the film. The methods used to track down and assassinate the Black September members were much more complicated than the methods portrayed in the film; for example, the tracking of the Black September cell members was achieved by a network of Mossad agents, not an informant as depicted in the film.

Atlantic Productions, producers of BAFTA-nominated documentary Munich: Mossad's Revenge, listed several discrepancies between Spielberg's film and the information it obtained from interviews with Mossad agents involved in the operation. It noted that the film suggests one group carried out almost all the assassinations, whereas in reality it was a much larger team. Mossad did not work with a mysterious French underworld figure as portrayed in the book and the film. The assassination campaign did not end because agents lost their nerve but because of the Lillehammer affair in which an innocent Moroccan waiter was killed. This is not mentioned in the film. As acknowledged by Spielberg, the targets were not all directly involved in Munich.

Former Mossad operatives criticized the film for inacurrately portraying Mossad operations. David Kimche, the former deputy director of the Mossad, said "I think it is a tragedy that a person of the stature of Steven Spielberg, who has made such fantastic films, should have based this film on a book that is a falsehood." Former Mossad operatives Gad Shimron and Victor Ostrovsky also dismissed the scene in which Prime Minister Golda Meir personally recruits Avner to lead the team as fiction. Mossad veterans were critical of the modus operandi portrayed by the film, in which a single hit team is sent into the field for months, and which includes a forger and bomb-maker to enable it to function alone. They claimed that in reality, the assassinations were conducted by large numbers of personnel, with hit teams assembled and sent out on an ad hoc basis, never spending more than a few days or at most weeks in the field, and withdrawn as soon as each mission was complete. The all-male makeup of the team was criticized; former operatives claimed it was standard practice to include female agents on such missions to help get closer to targets. The film's portrayal of the assassins as gradually developing feelings of revulsion over what they were doing was also panned as inaccurate, with veterans claiming that the assassins did not doubt what they were doing and that the Mossad provides psychologists for any agents who develop doubts about their missions.

According to British intelligence writer Gordon Thomas, senior Mossad personnel, among them director general Meir Dagan, held a private viewing of the film, and that "In the darkened cinema they sat first in silence and then a steady mounting murmured chorus of 'it could never have happened like this' … 'this is fantasy' … 'this is pure fiction' … 'this is history, Hollywood style'." Thomas cited Dagan as calling the film "absolute rubbish" and claiming that those who view Munich would come away with a "seriously distorted view of the truth." He also cited one of Dagan's aides as stating "Dagan felt Munich is more Indiana Jones than any semblance of reality. The hunting down of the Black September killers was a carefully controlled operation that involved a large number of people. The kidon had undergone weeks of studying their targets. Little of this appears in the film."

Soundtrack

The film score was composed and conducted by John Williams.

The soundtrack album was nominated for the Academy Award for Best Original Score but lost to the score of the film Brokeback Mountain. It was also nominated for the Grammy Award for Best Score Soundtrack for Visual Media but lost to the score of Memoirs of a Geisha (also scored by Williams).

AllMusic rated the soundtrack three and a half stars out of five. Filmtracks.com rated it four out of five. SoundtrackNet rated it four and a half out of five. ScoreNotes graded it "A−".

Accolades

See also
 List of Israeli assassinations
 Extrajudicial killing
 Operations conducted by the Mossad
 Palestinian political violence
 Sword of Gideon

References

Further reading
  Alt URL

External links

2005 action thriller films
2005 films
2000s action drama films
2000s spy films
2000s thriller drama films
Amblin Entertainment films
American action drama films
American action thriller films
American political drama films
American political thriller films
American spy films
Canadian historical drama films
Drama films based on actual events
DreamWorks Pictures films
English-language Canadian films
Films scored by John Williams
Films about assassinations
Films about Jews and Judaism
Films about terrorism in Europe
Films about the Mossad
Films about the 1972 Summer Olympics
Films directed by Steven Spielberg
Films produced by Kathleen Kennedy
Films produced by Barry Mendel
Films produced by Steven Spielberg
Films set in 1972
Films set in West Germany
Films set in Greece
Films set in London
Films set in Munich
Films set in New York City
Films set in Paris
Films set in Rome
Films set in the Netherlands
Films shot in Budapest
Films shot in Hungary
Films shot in Malta
Films shot in New York City
Films shot in Paris
Israeli–Palestinian conflict films
Munich massacre
Operation Wrath of God
Political films based on actual events
Films with screenplays by Eric Roth
Films with screenplays by Tony Kushner
Shin Bet in fiction
Spy films based on actual events
The Kennedy/Marshall Company films
Universal Pictures films
Cultural depictions of Golda Meir
Films set in Cyprus
Films set in Lebanon
Films set in Israel
Alliance Atlantis films
2005 drama films
Films based on non-fiction books
Canadian thriller drama films
Canadian political drama films
2000s American films
2000s Canadian films